KF Bashkimi Koretin is a professional football club from Kosovo which competes in the Second League. The club is based in Koretin. Their home ground is the Koretin Stadium which has a seating capacity of 600.

See also
 List of football clubs in Kosovo

References

Football clubs in Kosovo
Association football clubs established in 1974
Kamenica, Kosovo